Massazza is a small comune (municipality) in the Province of Biella in the Italian region Piedmont, located about  northeast of Turin, Italy and about  southeast of Biella, Italy.

Massazza borders the following municipalities: Benna, Cossato, Mottalciata, Salussola, Verrone, Villanova Biellese. It is home to a castle, built on a spur above the Biellese Baraggia natural area. The edifice was mentioned for the first time in 1239.

References

Cities and towns in Piedmont